Billy may refer to:
 Billy (name), a name (and list of people with the name)

Animals 
 Billy (dog), a dog breed
 Billy (pigeon), awarded the Dickin Medal in 1945
 Billy (pygmy hippo), a pet of U.S. President Calvin Coolidge
 Billy, a young male domestic goat

Film 
 Billy (Black Christmas), a character from Black Christmas
 Billy (Saw), a puppet from Saw
 Billy: The Early Years, a 2008 biographical film about Billy Graham

Literature 
 Billy (novel), a 1990 novel by Whitley Strieber
 Billy, a 2002 biography of Billy Connolly by Pamela Stephenson

Music

Musicals 
 Billy (musical), a musical based on Billy Liar
 Billy, a 1969 Broadway musical with music and lyrics by Gene Allen and Ron Dante

Albums 
 Billy (Samiam album) (1992)
 Billy (Feedtime album)

Songs 
 "Billy" (Kathy Linden song), a 1958 song by Kathy Linden
 "Billy", a 1986 song by Céline Dion from The Best of Celine Dion
 "Billy", a 1973 song by Bob Dylan from the Pat Garrett & Billy the Kid soundtrack
 "Billy", a song by James Blunt from Back to Bedlam
 "Billy", a song by Nik Kershaw from 15 Minutes
 "Billy", a song by 6ix9ine from Day69

Places 
 Billy, Allier, France
 Billy, Calvados, France
 Billy, Loir-et-Cher, France
 Billy, County Antrim, a parish in Northern Ireland
 Billy-Berclau, in the Pas-de-Calais département
 Billy-Chevannes, in the Nièvre département
 Billy-le-Grand, in the Marne département
 Billy-lès-Chanceaux, in the Côte-d'Or département
 Billy-Montigny, in the Pas-de-Calais département
 Billy-sous-Mangiennes, in the Meuse département
 Billy-sur-Aisne, in the Aisne département
 Billy-sur-Oisy, in the Nièvree département
 Billy-sur-Ourcq, in the Aisne département

Television 
 Billy (1979 TV series), a CBS sitcom starring Steve Guttenberg
 Billy (1992 TV series), an ABC sitcom starring Billy Connolly
 "Billy" (Angel), a 2001 episode of Angel

Other uses
 Billy (bookcase), a bookcase sold by IKEA
 Billy (crater), a crater on the Moon
 Billy (slave), African-American slave accused of treason
 Billy Beer, a beer brand popularized by Billy Carter
 Billy doll, a "gay doll" created in 1997
 Billy the Kid (1859–1881), American Old West gunfighter born Henry McCarty, also known as William H. Bonney
 Billycan or billy, a cooking pot used for camping

See also 
 
 
 
 
 Bili (disambiguation)
 Bill (disambiguation)
 Billie (disambiguation)
 Billy the Bus, character in children's book series by Eileen Gibb
 Billy the Cat (disambiguation)
 Billy the Cat and Katie, fictional superheroes from The Beano
 Blue billy, a ferrocyanide land contaminant, typically found around old gasworks
 Puffing Billy (locomotive), first commercial railway steam locomotive in the UK 
 Will (disambiguation)
 William (disambiguation) 
 Willy (disambiguation)
 William Lee (disambiguation), including Bill Lee